Derek Higgins (born June 12, 1964) is an Irish former race car driver.

Born in Dublin, he was a two-time winner of the Mexican Formula 3 championship in 1995 and 1997 before moving to the American Indy Lights series in 1998. After two successful seasons where he racked up four wins and finished 5th and 7th in series points, he completed his Indy Racing League rookie test at Walt Disney World Speedway with McCormack Motorsports, expecting to find a ride in the series. However, he was unable sign a deal with a team and returned to Indy Lights for a partial season in 2000 and a complete season in 2001, the series' last. After Indy Lights he competed in a few Toyota Atlantic races in 2002 and has not competed in a notable professional race since. Derek then became the Assistant Team Manager to Conquest Racing which races in the Indy Racing League. He then moved on to work for Panther Racing.  Higgins has also worked as a spotter, notably spotting for driver Townsend Bell in the 2013 Indianapolis 500 and driver Juan Pablo Montoya in the 2014 Indianapolis 500.

References

1964 births
Irish racing drivers
Indy Lights drivers
British Formula Three Championship drivers
Japanese Formula 3 Championship drivers
Mexican Formula Three Championship drivers
Atlantic Championship drivers
Living people
Formula Ford drivers

RSM Marko drivers
German Formula Three Championship drivers
Paul Stewart Racing drivers